(S)-2-hydroxypropylphosphonic acid epoxidase (HPP epoxidase, HppE, 2-hydroxypropylphosphonic acid epoxidase, Fom4, (S)-2-hydroxypropylphosphonate epoxidase) is an enzyme with systematic name (S)-2-hydroxypropylphosphonate,NADH:oxygen epoxidase. This enzyme catalyses the following chemical reaction

 (S)-2-hydroxypropylphosphonate + NADH + H+ + O2  (1R,2S)-epoxypropylphosphonate + NAD+ + 2 H2O

(S)-2-hydroxypropylphosphonic acid epoxidase contains one non-heme iron centre per monomer.

References

External links 
 

EC 1.14.19